Matt Worley (born 6 September 1997) is a Hong Konger professional rugby union player currently playing for the Bedford Blues in the English RFU Championship. He plays at the fullback and wing positions. Since 2016 Worley has competed for Hong Kong at international level. First with the under-20 side in the 2016 and 2017 World Rugby U20 Trophy, before making his debut for the Hong Kong senior side in 2022.

Background
Worley moved to Hong Kong aged five due to his father's work commitments. He began playing rugby in the Hong Kong Football Club's Mini Rugby Program. He attended South Island School where he played secondary school rugby. Appearing for Hong Kong at age group level, he played the majority of his junior career at scrum half. Worley represented Hong Kong at under 16, 18 and under 20 level.

Club career
Whilst playing junior and schools rugby in Hong Kong, Worley was offered the opportunity to spend four weeks with Racing 92. Primarily a PR stunt, the arrangement was facilitated by joint sponsor for Racing 92 and the Hong Kong Football Club Rugby Section, Natixis. The youngster quickly impressed and stayed with Racing 92 on an academy contract. He moved from scrum half to full back after language barriers prevented him from effectively managing the 9 position.

Worley featured for the Racing Espoirs during their title winning under-23's French league campaign. His success with the Racing development team earned him his first senior contract with the club in 2017. Worley's senior debut came during Racing's Natixis Rugby Cup bout against Cell C Sharks. Racing lost the game, 31–14.

In May 2018, it was announced that Worley had signed to the Northampton Saints senior academy. He made his senior debut for the club in a game against Bristol Bears in the Premiership Rugby Cup. His debut makes Worley the 1998th Northampton Saint. In March 2019, it was announced that Worley will leave Northampton Saints. During the 2018/2019 season Worley was dual registered with Bedford Blues where he made 8 appearances scoring 5 tries. In March 2019, it was announced that Worley had signed with Bedford Blues ahead of the 2019/2020 season.

References

External links
Northampton Saints Player Profile

1997 births
Living people
English rugby union players
Rugby union fullbacks
Rugby union wings
Northampton Saints players
Rugby union players from Plymouth, Devon
English emigrants to Hong Kong
Hong Kong rugby union players
English expatriate sportspeople in France
Hong Kong expatriate sportspeople in France
Hong Kong expatriate rugby union players
Expatriate rugby union players in France
English expatriate rugby union players
Hong Kong international rugby union players